Monterblanc is a commune in the Morbihan department and Brittany region of north-western France.

Geography
The river Arz forms most of the commune's northern border.

Demographics
In French the inhabitants of Monterblanc are known as Monterblancais.

See also
Communes of the Morbihan department

References

External links

Official website 
 Mayors of Morbihan Association 

Communes of Morbihan